Ryan David Pringle (born 17 April 1992) is an English cricketer who most recently played for Durham County Cricket Club. He is a right-arm off break bowler who also bats right handed. He made his list A debut for the county in August 2012 against Hampshire.

References

External links
 

1992 births
Living people
English cricketers
Durham cricketers
Cricketers from Sunderland
Northumberland cricketers